Star Eyes is a 1963 studio album by Sarah Vaughan, arranged by Marty Manning.

Reception
The AllMusic review by Scott Yanow thought that "although nothing all that memorable occurs, Sassy's voice is heard very much in its prime".

Track listing
 "Star Eyes" (Gene de Paul, Don Raye) - 4:25 
 "Once Upon a Summertime" (Johnny Mercer, Eddie Barclay, Michel Legrand) - 2:45 
 "Don't Go to Strangers" (Redd Evans, Arthur Kent, David Mann) - 2:35 
 "Icy Stone" (Henry Glover, Morris Levy) - 2:52 
 "I Was Telling Him About You" (Morris Charlap, Don George) - 3:54 
 "I'll Never Be The Same" (Gus Kahn, Matty Malneck, Frank Signorelli) - 2:49 
 "Call Me Irresponsible" (Jimmy Van Heusen, Sammy Cahn) - 2:38 
 "Bewildered" (Leonard Whitcup, Teddy Powell) - 4:04 
 "Do You Remember" (J. Bailey, Levy) - 4:02 
 "There'll Be Other Times" (Marian McPartland, Margaret Jones) - 2:37 
 "Within Me I Know" (Duke Ellington, Sid Kuller) - 3:03 
 "As Long as He Needs Me" (Lionel Bart) - 3:12
 "Enchanted Wall" (Unknown) - 3:12

Personnel
Sarah Vaughan - vocals
Marty Manning - arranger, conductor

References

Roulette Records albums
Sarah Vaughan albums
1963 albums